Giammarco Menga (11 november 1990, Sulmona) is an Italian sports journalist, television presenter and author.

Early life and education 
Menga had his graduation from Liceo Scientifico dell'Aquila and then joined the Faculty of Literature at the Sapienza University of Rome and obtained a degree course in Modern Literature, publishing and journalism.

Career 
Giammarco had his television debut at the age of 11 at Teleabruzzo. He then worked with laQtv, Tvsei and wrote for IlCentro newspaper, writing about sports. Giammarco got an opportunity to present his book at Mediaset in 2016 and later joined them as sports correspondent in central and southern Italy. He worked at SportsMediaset for three years as a journalist, envoy and as a specialist on football transfer market. He also worked with Premium Sports and for Mattino Cinque for the morning programme on Canale 5. Since 2016, Menga has been a press officer and video reporter for the Zanetti Football Training Camp.

Publications and documentaries 
 Sportivamente D'Annunzio (2016) 
Sportivamente d’Annunzio – Focus Mediaset (2019)
Il Postino sogna sempre 2 volte - Short Film (Veleno Production, 2019) 
Il Vate armato - Focus (2020)

Awards 
 51st Coni Award at Literary Competition for special reports in Non-Fiction Category for writing Sportivamente D’Annunzio, 2019
Best emerging Sports Journalist in Andrea Fortunato National Award., december 2021
Best young correspondent 2020 at "Giuseppe Luconi'' National Journalism Award.
Premio Nazionale of Journalism "Angelo Maria Palmieri", Junior Category, 2013

References 

Italian sports journalists
Italian sportswriters
Italian television presenters
Italian male journalists
1990 births
Living people